Phanaeus vindex, the rainbow scarab, is a North American dung beetle, found from the eastern US to Arizona and Mexico. The head is a metallic yellow color, and males have a black horn which curves backward toward the thorax. Both sexes have yellow antennae which can retract into a ball on the underside of the head. The thorax is a shiny coppery color, with yellow or green on the sides. The abdomen is metallic green. The underbelly is black and green. The beetles are about 1–2.2 cm long.

Males and females work in pairs to dig burrows beneath animal excrement. They move some of the excrement down into the tunnel, where the female lays her eggs in it. The grubs feed on the excrement for several instars until pupating.

This species, like other dung beetles, is not a pest, and plays an important role in reducing waste in the environment.

References

vindex
Coprophagous insects